Angraecum expansum is a species of orchid found in Réunion.

References 

expansum
Orchids of Réunion
Endemic flora of Réunion